Senate elections were held in Kazakhstan on 19 August 2011. All 16 seats representing the regions of Kazakhstan were elected by the local legislative bodies (maslihats). 3172 of the 3283 eligible electorates voted in the election.

Electoral system 
The members of the Senate of Kazakhstan are nonpartisan and are indirectly elected by the local legislative bodies Maslihats every six years. Each region and cities of Almaty and Astana are represented by two senators while 15 senators are appointed by the President of Kazakhstan.

References

Kazakhstan
Elections in Kazakhstan
2011 in Kazakhstan
August 2011 events in Asia